Jon Sivewright (born 22 May 1965) is an Australian actor. He is best known for portraying Tony Holden in Home and Away, a role he played from 2005 to 2010

Biography 
Before becoming an actor he worked as a miner and spent 12 years as a fireman. He moved to live in Sydney in 2003 and was accepted into the Actors' Centre in Surry Hills, Sydney where he completed the two and a half-year junior course.

His first television acting job was playing Strike Team Firie in an episode of Fireflies entitled Fighting Fire with Fire which aired in 2004. He made a number of other minor television appearances before securing a role in Home and Away.

Home and Away
In August 2005 Jon secured his first regular TV role playing Tony Holden in the long running Australian Soap opera Home and Away. His plays the father of Lucas Holden and Jack Holden. Since arriving in the bay he has been romantically linked with Beth Hunter. But when Beth died he paired up with, and still is with, Rachel Armstrong, a doctor. It was announced he will be leaving in 2010 after five years of playing the character Tony Holden in home and away.

Filmography

Films
<div style="font-size: 100%">

Television

External links

Jon Sivewright's profile at homeandaway.com.au

1965 births
Australian male soap opera actors
Australian male film actors
Living people